Hadiabad (also Romanized as Hādīābād; also known as Hārīābād) is a village in Solgi Rural District, Khezel District, Nahavand County, Hamadan Province, Iran. At the 2006 census, its population was 352, in 88 families.

References 

Populated places in Nahavand County